Allahlu (also Romanized as Allahlū; also known as Lalahlū, Lalakhlu, Lalehlū, and Lallahlū) is a village in Qaflankuh-e Sharqi Rural District of Kaghazkonan District, Mianeh County, East Azerbaijan province, Iran. At the 2006 National Census, its population was 520 in 155 households. The following census in 2011 counted 415 people in 127 households. The latest census in 2016 showed a population of 640 people in 215 households; it was the largest village in its rural district.

References 

Meyaneh County

Populated places in East Azerbaijan Province

Populated places in Meyaneh County